II is the second studio album from the band Unknown Mortal Orchestra, released in February 2013. A 15-track Deluxe Edition was released in October, along with the EP Blue Record.

Artwork
The album cover is a photo of British author Janet Farrar taken by husband Stewart Farrar.

Critical reception

II received acclaim from most music critics. At Metacritic, which assigns a normalized rating out of 100 to reviews from mainstream critics, the album received an average score of 78, based on 27 reviews, which indicates "generally favorable reviews".

AllMusic gave the album four out of five stars, saying "from the opening moments of the trippy, lo-fi intro 'From the Sun' all the way to the funky-as-a-Hendrix-ballad closer 'Secret Xtians,' II takes risks and achieves greatness."

NME gave the album eight out of ten, saying "raw melody made Unknown Mortal Orchestra exciting two years ago; now they’ve matched it with attention to detail."

The Observer gave the album three out of five stars, described "Swim and Sleep (Like a Shark)" as "conjoin[ing] sleep, prettiness and unease", and the album as having "longueurs where Nielson can get a little vague and inward-directed."

II won Best Alternative Album in the 2013 New Zealand Music Awards.

Track listing

B-sides
 "Waves of Confidence" – B-side on the "Swim and Sleep (Like a Shark)" single release.

Blue Record (EP)

Source:

Personnel
 Ruban Nielson – performance, recording; drums 
 Chris Nielson – horns 
 Jacob Portrait – bass 
 Gregory Rogove – drums 
 Kody Nielson – drums 
 Joe Lambert – mastering
 Stewart Farrar – cover photo of Janet Farrar

References

2013 albums
Unknown Mortal Orchestra albums
Jagjaguwar albums